Beck – Sista vittnet (English: Beck – The Last Witness) is a 2002 film about the Swedish police detective Martin Beck directed by Harald Hamrell.

Cast 
 Peter Haber as Martin Beck
 Mikael Persbrandt as Gunvald Larsson
 Malin Birgerson as Alice Levander
 Marie Göranzon as Margareta Oberg
 Hanns Zischler as Josef Hillman
 Ingvar Hirdwall as Martin Beck's neighbour
 Rebecka Hemse as Inger (Martin Beck's daughter)
 Jimmy Endeley as Robban
 Mårten Klingberg as Nick
 Peter Hüttner as Oljelund
 Gunilla Röör as Lillemor "Limo" Fransson
 Thomas Hanzon as Mellgren
 Bo Höglund as Mats (the waiter)
 Anki Lidén as Marianne Berncroft
 Maksim Lapitskii as Teddy
 Mattias Silvell as Lech
 Sofia Helin as Sofija
 Jarmo Mäkinen as Juri
 Mikael Rundquist as Verner Jonasson
 Jan Waldekranz as Hollman
 Peter Falkenborg as Löfqvist

References

External links 

2000s Swedish-language films
Martin Beck films
2002 television films
2002 films
2000s crime films
Films directed by Harald Hamrell
2000s police procedural films
2000s Swedish films